The 20 August 1955 Stadium is a multi-use stadium in Béchar, Algeria.  It is currently used mostly for football matches and is the home ground of JS Saoura. The stadium holds 20,000 spectators after extension. The stadium was renovated several times, with the pitch being upgraded to synthetic turf in 2017. It has also been renovated in order to handle hosting international competitions.

References

External links
Stadium profile - competition.dz
dzfoot club profile

Sports venues in Algeria
Buildings and structures in Béchar Province
JS Saoura